Mohammad Abdullah Al Gergawi is an Emirati politician who is the Minister of Cabinet Affairs of the United Arab Emirates and the Chairman of the Executive Office of Sheikh Mohammed bin Rashid Al Maktoum, in the Government of Dubai.

Early life 
Al Gergawi was born in Dubai in 1963. His father, Abdulla Ali Al Gergawi, was a merchant in the city. He completed his primary and secondary school education in the emirate and attained a bachelor's degree in Business Administration from the United States.

Political career 
Al Gergawi was the Chairman of Dubai Holding until March 2017. Through Dubai Holding, Al Gergawi helped envision and launch TECOM Group, Dubai Properties Group, Emirates Integrated Telecommunications, and Family Entertainment and New Media.

In 2007, Al Gergawi was appointed Chairman of the Mohammed bin Rashid Al Maktoum Foundation. He is the Secretary General of the Mohammed bin Rashid Global Initiatives, a charitable foundation that consolidates the philanthropic initiatives undertaken by Mohammed bin Rashid Al Maktoum.

References

External links 

 Mohammad Al Gergawi's page, Ministry of Cabinet Affairs, United Arab Emirates.
 Mohammad Al Gergawi's page, World Economic Forum.

Emirati politicians
Emirati businesspeople
People from Dubai
Living people
Government ministers of the United Arab Emirates
Academic staff of Mohammed bin Rashid School of Government
1963 births